is a 1976 animated short film that crosses over Go Nagai's super robots Grendizer and Great Mazinger. The movie features alternate versions of events from both series, and, as with the rest of the Vs. films, is not canonical to either one. The film was released in almost all countries where the original Grendizer and Great Mazinger series were also shown, most prominently in Italy, France and the Middle East.

Plot

After many attempts to destroy Grendizer and conquer Earth, King Vega sends General Barendos and his troops in a special mission. Before landing, Barendos stops at moonbase and warns the two officials there that in case of his success they will be both dismissed and killed. Barendos arrives on earth and captures Duke Fleed's closest ally, Koji Kabuto. While under a mind control in captivity, Koji reveals the history and location of both Mazinger Z and Great Mazinger. King Vega seizes the opportunity to capture the Great Mazinger, and then forces Duke Fleed and his Grendizer to do battle against Great Mazinger. Grendizer and Great Mazinger clash in battle until Grendizer manages to deactivate Great Mazinger using a special shot, suggested by Koji. In the forth chapter (titled Terror of the Two Demons) of one of the Grendizer manga adaptations,  Koji Kabuto and Tetsuya Tsurugi are mind controlled by a brain wave machine created by Vegan Commander Depel. This attempt was countered thanks to Boss Borot damaging Gepel's base and destroying the brain wave machine, ending the Mazingers from going on a rampage and destroying the city. The chapter ends in a battle between Mazinger Z, Great Mazinger, and Grendizer against Saucer Beast Zardan, with the heroes claiming victory.

Staff
Production Studio: Toei Doga, Dynamic Planning
Original work: Go Nagai, Dynamic Planning
Director: Osamu Kasai
Assistant director: Johei Matsura
Animation director: Kazuo Komatsubara
Scenario: Keisuke Fujikawa
Planning: Ken Ariga, Toshio Katsuta
Producer: Chiaki Imada
Art director: Iwamitsu Ito
Music: Shunsuke Kikuchi, Michiaki Watanabe
Theme Song: "Uchuu no Yuusha Grendizer" by Isao Sasaki
Cast: Kei Tomiyama (Duke Fleed / Daisuke Umon), Hiroya Ishimaru (Koji Kabuto), Joji Yanami (Dr. Umon), Chiyoko Kawashima (Hikaru Makiba), Kazuko Sawada (Goro Makiba), Kenichi Ogata (Blacky), Kosei Tomita (Gandal Shirei), Junji Yamada

See also
UFO Robot Grendizer
Great Mazinger

External links
UFO Robot Grendizer tai Great Mazinger  at Toei's corporate website

UFO Robot Grendizer tai Great Mazinger at allcinema 
UFO Robot Grendizer tai Great Mazinger at Animemorial

1976 anime films
1976 manga
Mazinger
Super robot anime and manga
Anime short films
1970s animated short films
Kodansha manga
Toei Animation films